Otto Farrant (born 13 November 1996) is an English actor. He is best known for his portrayal of the titular character in Amazon Prime's spy thriller series Alex Rider (2020–present), which received critical acclaim. He previously had supporting television roles in The White Queen (2013), War & Peace (2016) and Mrs. Wilson (2018). As a theatre actor, he has performed at venues such as the Royal National Theatre and the Young Vic.

Life and career
Farrant was born in Hammersmith, West London and raised in Tooting, South London. He attended Graveney School. He first became interested in acting after watching a performance of Gavroche in Les Misérables. When he was young, he participated in theatre at Stagecoach Theatre School in Battersea. In 2011, he worked alongside Joanne Froggatt and Joe Cole in a production of Little Platoons at the Bush Theatre.

At 11 years of age, Farrant began performing on stage in productions at the likes of the National Theatre and Shakespeare's Globe theatre. In 2010, he made his big screen debut as Young Perseus in Clash of the Titans. In 2013, Farrant starred as Thomas Grey for 5 episodes of BBC historical drama The White Queen. In 2016, he played Petya Rostov in the BBC historical Russian based drama serial War & Peace, then played Nigel Wilson in the 2018 BBC miniseries Mrs. Wilson.

In 2019, Farrant was cast in the leading role in Amazon Prime Video's Alex Rider, a television adaptation of Anthony Horowitz's novel series, where a teenage schoolboy is recruited by MI6. Farrant stars alongside Vicky McClure and Stephen Dillane. The show premiered in the UK and Ireland on 4 June 2020, following six months of filming in 2019. The show's second season was produced during the first half of 2021 and released in December 2021. The third season began production in October 2022.

Acting credits

Film

Television

Stage

References

External links
 
Otto Farrant profile

Living people
1996 births
21st-century English actors
English male child actors
English male film actors
English male stage actors
English male television actors
Male actors from London
People from Hammersmith
People from Tooting
Year of birth uncertain